The Korisliiga is the premier basketball league in Finland. The 2007-08 season was the 68th Finnish club basketball season. It began on October 6, 2007 and ended on April 27, 2008. The Espoon Honka successfully defended their national championship with a 3-1 victory over the Kouvot. Petteri Koponen won the MVP Award and Akeem Scott won the Finals MVP Award.

Regular season

Individual leaders 
Statistics are for the regular season.

Scoring

Assists

Rebounds

Playoffs

References
Korisliiga Schedule & Results

Korisliiga seasons
Finnish
Koris